Ysbyty Ystrad Fawr is a community hospital at Ystrad Mynach in Caerphilly County Borough in Wales. It is managed by Aneurin Bevan University Health Board.

History
The hospital was commissioned to replace Aberbargoed Hospital, Caerphilly District Miners Hospital, Oakdale Hospital and Ystrad Mynach Hospital. It was officially opened by Lesley Griffiths AM in March 2012.

Services
The hospital has 269 beds in single ensuite bedrooms for medical surgical and palliative patients and also has a minor injuries unit.

References

Hospital buildings completed in 2011
Hospitals in Caerphilly County Borough
Hospitals established in 2011
NHS hospitals in Wales
Aneurin Bevan University Health Board